The Fayette Tribune is a newspaper serving Oak Hill, West Virginia, and surrounding Fayette County. Published Monday and Thursday, it has a circulation of 1,093 and is owned by Community Newspaper Holdings.

History 
In 1915, Charles A. Goddard acquired the Fayette Tribune and Free Press, a name simplified to the Fayette Tribune in 1924. In 1930 the Tribune was sold to the Woodyard brothers, who also purchased the Fayette Democrat.

The Fayette Tribune was the first newspaper to call attention to the Hawk's Nest Tunnel disaster, a large scale incident of occupational silicosis, considered to be  one of the worst industrial tragedies in the history of the United States. Reporting in February 1931 the paper broke the story:

 "Their [sic] is a great deal of comment regarding the unusually large number of deaths among the colored laborers in the tunnel works. The deaths totaled about  37 in the past two weeks."

The mining continued, however, resulting in an estimated 476 deaths before construction halted.

Related Resources
 List of newspapers in West Virginia

References

Newspapers published in West Virginia